Insaniyat Ke Dushman  is a 1987 Hindi-language action drama film in which a dedicated police officer is pitted against a gang of drug dealers.  The film stars Dharmendra, Shatrughan Sinha, Raj Babbar, Smita Patil, Dimple Kapadia, Anita Raj and introducing Sumeet Saigal paired opposite Anita Raj and playing Dharmendra's younger brother.

Cast

 Dharmendra as Inspector Shekhar Kapoor
 Shatrughan Sinha as Advocate Kailashnath 
 Raj Babbar as Ajay Verma
 Dimple Kapadia as Shilpa
 Anita Raj as Shashi
 Sumeet Saigal as Prakash
 Shakti Kapoor as Shakti Singh
 Amjad Khan as Pratap Singh
 Kader Khan as Jagmohan Mishra
 Smita Patil as Laxmi
 Aruna Irani as Mona
 Om Prakash as Jailor Saxena
 Iftekhar as Senior Police Officer
 Paintal as Das
 Urmila Bhatt as Sheetal
 Krishan Dhawan as Defence Lawyer
 Chandrashekhar as Inspector Verma
Pinchoo Kapoor as Judge
Jankidas Mehra as Manager of Shakti Singh

Music
"Pyar Jab Bhi Hoga Naseeb Se Hoga" was written by Sameer, the rest of songs were penned by Indeevar.

References

External links
 

1987 films
1980s Hindi-language films
Films scored by Anu Malik